A list of films produced in Brazil in 1983:

See also
1983 in Brazil
1983 in Brazilian television

References

External links
Brazilian films of 1983 at the Internet Movie Database

Brazil
1983
Films